Mabel Edeline Strickland,  (8 January 1899 – 29 November 1988), was an Anglo-Maltese journalist, newspaper proprietor and politician.

Family and personal life

Strickland was the daughter of Sir Gerald Strickland, later the 4th Prime Minister of Malta, and Lady Edeline Sackville.

Her mother was the eldest daughter of Reginald Sackville, 7th Earl De La Warr of Knole, Kent.  

Mabel never married, leaving the bulk of her estate to her sole heir Robert Hornyold-Strickland.  Despite Mabel set up the Strickland Foundation "for herself and her heirs in perpetuity"  in 1979.  However some of her key assets including the majority shareholding of Allied Newspapers Ltd together with her family home and all of her personal, legal and administrative papers were diverted by her executors away from Mabel's heir. This has resulted in two significant court cases taken out against the Foundation and Allied Newspapers Ltd by her heir.

Residences
Mabel Strickland lived the most of her life at Villa Parisio in Lija, Malta. Prior to this she lived in her family home of Villa Bologna, in Attard, Malta - home of her father Lord Strickland.

Career

Strickland founded a newspaper group in Malta with her father and her stepmother, Lady Strickland, DBE (Margaret, daughter of Edward Hulton). In 1935 she became editor of The Times of Malta and "Il Berqa" before taking over as Managing Director of the Group on the death of her father in 1940. The paper never missed an issue throughout the Siege of Malta in World War Two, despite taking direct hits on several occasions. She formed and led the Progressive Constitutionalist Party during the 1950s and was one of the principal political leaders of the 1950s, participating in the integration talks in 1956-57 as well as opposing independence in 1964. She was elected to the Maltese Parliament in 1962. She always fought passionately for a free and independent press and to maintain Malta's ties with Britain and the Commonwealth. On her retirement she established the Strickland Foundation in the name of her family.

Death

Mabel Strickland died on 29 November 1988, and is buried in the Strickland family crypt in St. Paul's Cathedral, Mdina. 

Having never married or had children of her own, Mabel Strickland's chosen sole heir was her great-nephew Robert Hornyold-Strickland. However upon Strickland's death after Robert Hornyold-Strickland was out of Malta, Mabel, as an old lady, was persuaded to change her will by the lawyer who was to become one of her two Executors.  Despite the revised will, her great nephew always remained her sole heir. But a result of the revised and very unclear will, her estate has become the subject of a legal conflict between Hornyold-Strickland and the Strickland Foundation. Mabel Strickland set up this foundation "for herself and her heirs in perpetuity".   As soon as Robert Hornyold-Strickland took legal action against the executors in 2010, having tried to find an amicable settlement for decades, the aging Executors saw fit to transfer the majority shareholding in Allied Newspapers Ltd (Times of Malta) that had been held in their own names (as executors of the estate), directly to The Strickland Foundation in a highly irregular manner.  This is because The Strickland Foundation is registered as a legal person, being as it is a "body corporate", and is, anyway ineligible to be a shareholder both under Maltese Company Law and also under the terms of Allied Newspapers Ltd own Articles of Associate which disallows any "body corporate" from being a shareholder.   This irregular transfer, where no instrument of transfer has ever been produced by the executors, is now also the issue of another court case taken out by Robert Hornyold-Strickland and is still in the courts.

See also
Villa Parisio

References

https://www.independent.com.mt/articles/2021-04-07/local-news/It-is-for-the-courts-to-decide-whether-my-claims-are-justified-Robert-Hornyold-Strickland-6736232383

https://www.independent.com.mt/articles/2021-04-12/local-news/Strickland-Foundation-hijacked-Mabel-s-legacy-for-their-own-political-ends-Robert-Strickland-6736232531

https://www.maltatoday.com.mt/news/national/108808/strickland_heir_on_allied_board_insists_hillman_promotion_was_fait_accompli#.YIRl8pAzZPY

Maltese journalists
Officers of the Order of the British Empire
Place of birth missing
1899 births
1988 deaths
Members of the House of Representatives of Malta
Progressive Constitutionalist Party (Malta) politicians
20th-century women writers
Maltese women journalists
20th-century Maltese women politicians
20th-century Maltese politicians
Leaders of political parties in Malta
Maltese people of British descent
20th-century Maltese writers
20th-century Maltese women writers
20th-century journalists
English-language writers from Malta